The 2018 New Zealand Music Awards was the 53rd holding of the annual ceremony featuring awards for musical recording artists based in or originating from New Zealand. It took place on 15 November 2018 at Spark Arena in Auckland and was hosted by Kanoa Lloyd and Stan Walker. The awards show was broadcast live nationally on Three.

References

External links
Official New Zealand Music Awards website

New Zealand Music Awards, 2018
Music Awards, 2018
Aotearoa Music Awards
November 2018 events in New Zealand